Dudley Knight (July 1, 1939 – June 27, 2013) was an American voice, speech, and dialect expert, as well as a stage and television actor. He was best known for his long career as a speech and dialect teacher and voice director for professional theatre. He conducted workshops and lectures on voice and speech for actors and voice teachers worldwide.

Early life and career
Knight was born and raised in Rochester, Minnesota. He became interested in Shakespeare at age 9, during a class outing to see Laurence Olivier's film version of The Chronicle History of King Henry the Fifth with His Battell Fought at Agincourt in France (1944).
He graduated from the Yale School of Drama. He was a co-founder of Long Wharf Theatre in New Haven, Connecticut. He retired from the University of California, Irvine, where he taught for twenty years.  Knight coached voice, text, and dialects at many theatres, including the Utah Shakespearean Festival, the Colorado Shakespeare Festival, La Jolla Playhouse, South Coast Repertory, and American Conservatory Theater. From the mid to late 1970s, Knight hosted a weekly radio series, "The Graveyard Shift", on KPFK, Los Angeles, where he read famous horror stories.

He was a Master teacher of Fitzmaurice Voicework, which is based on the teachings of Catherine Fitzmaurice.  He conducted workshops where he taught Knight-Thompson Speechwork, a skills-based approach to speech and accent training for actors that places emphasis on developing the speaker's detailed awareness of and engagement with the skills that make up language. His 2012 book, Speaking With Skill, is considered a major work in its field.

Acting work
As an actor, he played major roles at American Conservatory Theater, South Coast Repertory, Mark Taper Forum, and the Utah and Colorado Shakespeare Festivals, among others. He is also known for roles in such films as the TV movie The Autobiography of Miss Jane Pittman (1974), The Candidate (1972) and One Is a Lonely Number (1972), as well as appearances on numerous TV series such as M*A*S*H, Police Story, Eight is Enough, The Facts of Life, and Knots Landing.

Personal life and death
He was married to noted American painter and sculptor Marta Whistler. Dudley Knight died of a heart attack at his home in Newport Beach, California.

Filmography

References

1939 births
2013 deaths
Voice coaches
American voice directors
Male actors from Minnesota
People from Rochester, Minnesota
American male film actors
American male television actors
University of California, Irvine faculty
Yale School of Drama alumni